George Burkinshaw (1 October 1922 – 1982) was an English professional footballer who played as a centre half.

Career
Born in Barnsley, Burkinshaw played for Woolley Colliery, Barnsley, Carlisle United, Bradford City and Goole Town.

References

1922 births
1982 deaths
English footballers
Barnsley F.C. players
Carlisle United F.C. players
Bradford City A.F.C. players
Goole Town F.C. players
English Football League players
Association football central defenders